Tsewang Rigzin is the current president of the Tibetan Youth Congress. He has held the position since September 2007, and on August 8, 2008 he was re-elected to serve through August 2013. Prior to attaining his current position he served as the president of the Portland/Vancouver regional chapter of the Tibetan Youth Congress.

Mr. Rigzin has been an outspoken critic of the Middle Way Approach to solving the problem of the Tibet situation, and has instead advocated for complete independence for Tibet. In this, he and the Tibetan Youth Congress are in disagreement with the Dalai Lama, who advocates for autonomy for Tibet within China.

See also 
 Legal basis for autonomy within China
 Tibetan independence movement
 Tibetan sovereignty debate
 Tibetan Youth Congress

References 

Tibetan people
Tibet freedom activists